The Volkswagen D24TIC is a 2.4-litre inline-six-cylinder (R6/I6) single overhead camshaft (SOHC) diesel engine, formerly manufactured by Volkswagen Group from August 1986 to December 1998.

Technical description and rated outputs
The engine is constructed in an identical manner to the Volkswagen D24T engine, and its earlier Volkswagen D24 engine - but includes an intercooler to aid its turbocharger in order to improve overall performance and consistency of performance. 
The ”TDIC” version is exactly the same as the other versions. Unlike the other variants this version has an oil cooler and more horsepower (127bhp)

Applications
08/1983–07/1990 — Volvo 740
08/1982–07/1990 — Volvo 760
08/1991–12/1995 — Volkswagen LT (ACL)
08/1990–07/1996 — Volvo 940
08/1990–07/1996 — Volvo 965

See also
list of Volkswagen Group diesel engines
list of discontinued Volkswagen Group diesel engines
Turbocharged Direct Injection

References

External links
Volkswagen Group corporate website
Chemnitz (Germany) - engine plant Mobility and Sustainability
Kassel (Germany) - engine plant Mobility and Sustainability
Salzgitter (Germany) - engine plant Mobility and Sustainability
Polkowice (Poland) - engine plant Mobility and Sustainability
São Carlos (Brazil) - engine plant Mobility and Sustainability
Shanghai (China) - engine plant Mobility and Sustainability

D24TIC
D24TIC
Diesel engines by model

Straight-six engines